The 1989–90 Scottish First Division season was won by St Johnstone, who were promoted four points ahead of Airdrieonians to the Premier Division. Albion Rovers and Alloa Athletic were relegated to the Second Division.

Table

References

Scottish First Division seasons
2
Scot